Super Star Wars is an action video game developed by LucasArts and Sculptured Software for the Super Nintendo Entertainment System. It is based on the 1977 film Star Wars: Episode IV - A New Hope. It was released by JVC Musical Industries in Japan in 1992 and Nintendo in North America in 1992 and Europe in 1993. The game was followed by two sequels based on the subsequent Star Wars films, Super Star Wars: The Empire Strikes Back (1993) and Super Star Wars: Return of the Jedi (1994). The game was re-released in November 1996 as part of Nintendo's Player's Choice series. It was released on the Wii’s Virtual Console by LucasArts in 2009. 

In 2015, Disney Interactive Studios re-released the game for the PlayStation 4 and PlayStation Vita, with Code Mystics developing the ports. The port features enhanced options for saving, including cross-save, leaderboards and trophies, and modern displays and controllers. The game was also made a part of a bundle with the purchase of Star Wars Battlefront for the PlayStation 4, which included Star Wars: Racer Revenge, Star Wars: Jedi Starfighter and Star Wars Bounty Hunter.

Super Star Wars features side-scrolling run and gun gameplay, although it has stages which feature other challenges, such as driving a landspeeder or piloting an X-wing. It also features multiple playable characters with different abilities.

Gameplay 

Super Star Wars generally follows the plot of Star Wars, although some allowances were made to adapt the story to suit an action game. For example, instead of simply buying C-3PO and R2-D2 from the Jawas, Luke Skywalker must fight his way to the top of a Jawa sandcrawler while leaping from a series of moving conveyor belts. Brief cutscenes between levels tell an abbreviated version of the film's story through written text. Later stages allow the player to control smuggler and pilot Han Solo or Chewbacca the Wookiee. The game also features several vehicle-based levels in which the player takes control of an X-Wing or a landspeeder.

Most of the stages consist of run and gun and platforming gameplay, with several different upgrades available to the standard blaster weapon. Luke can also wield a lightsaber after acquiring it from Obi Wan Kenobi. The end of the game has players reenacting Luke's Death Star trench run to destroy the Death Star, with Darth Vader confronting the player in his TIE Advanced x1.

Development 
Artist Jon Knoles did the visual designs for the characters, while Harrison Fong drew the backgrounds. Fong recounted that he did very little concept drawing before rendering the characters on the computer "because everybody knew what the Star Wars characters looked like." Originally, the game design was planned to give the characters a dark black outline around their bodies.  However, this idea was abandoned, as it was thought to make the characters too cartoonish-looking.

The "Kalhar Boss Monster" is based on one of the chess pieces R2D2 plays with on the Millennium Falcon in the film. There was a trash compactor level that was deleted from the game due to lack of cartridge space.  An image was published in an issue of Electronic Gaming Monthly around the time of the game's release.

The game's audio contains scores from the movie, which were all arranged by Sculptured Software's in-house musician Paul Webb. According to Webb, he was given the original handwritten scores that John Williams had created. Paul then used the company's in-house music software to convert the scores onto the Super NES's 8-channel sound chip. The game's instrument samples were taken from the Ensoniq EPS and EPS16 keyboards.

A PC port of Super Star Wars was in the works since 1994, by Danish game company Brain Bug and produced by Softgold. The game was almost completed, and was well into the playtesting phase, but in 1995 LucasArts decided to halt the development and cancel the release. An unfinished version of this port was leaked onto the internet.

A Mega Drive version was in the works by Sega Interactive from late 1992 to some point in 1993, when it was cancelled for unknown reasons. An early prototype's ROM was dumped in 2020.

Reception 

Entertainment Weekly wrote that "If you've ever fantasized about piloting an X-wing fighter into the heart of the Death Star, now you can do it—in simulated 3-D as well as reenact the movie's key plot developments." In 2009, Official Nintendo Magazine placed the game 68th on a list of the greatest Nintendo games.

Accolades

Super Star Wars was awarded Best Action/Adventure Game of 1992 by Electronic Gaming Monthly, as well as Best Movie-to-Game. Super Star Wars was rated 4th in Nintendo Power's top ten Super NES games of 1992. IGN ranked Super Star Wars 83rd on their "Top 100 SNES Games of All Time". In 2018, Complex listed the game 38th in its "The Best Super Nintendo Games of All Time." In 1995, Total! ranked the game 60th on their Top 100 SNES Games summarizing: "The sequels left a little to be desired but this is a great interpretation of the original and best film." In the same year, Flux magazine rated Super Star Wars 25th on its Top 100 Video Games. They lauded the game writing: "The second greatest SNES platform game after Super Mario World." They also praised the game's graphics and felt the game was easy.

See also
Star Wars, the NES game from previous year

Notes

References

External links

1992 video games
Cancelled DOS games
Cancelled Sega CD games
Cancelled Sega Genesis games
Code Mystics games
LucasArts games
Platform games
PlayStation 4 games
PlayStation Network games
PlayStation Vita games
Run and gun games
Single-player video games
Star Wars video games
Super Nintendo Entertainment System games
Video games developed in the United States
Virtual Console games